B. Vittaldas Shetty is an Indian politician who has been a minister in the Government of Karnataka.

Shetty was elected to the Karnataka Legislative Assembly in 1967 from the Puttur constituency. He also served as Minister of State for Food and Civil Supplies in Veerendra Patil's Cabinet.

References

State cabinet ministers of Karnataka
People from Dakshina Kannada district
Mysore MLAs 1967–1972
Living people
Year of birth missing (living people)